Altitude London is a collection of venues in the -high Millbank Tower, a skyscraper in central London. Altitude 360 London, along with The River Room London, The MillBank Cinema & Media Centre and The View Collection make up London's largest riverside venue as well as London's largest venue located in a skyscraper. The concept and design was the brainchild of Hong Kong born entrepreneur Justin Etzin who was The Global Brand Owner. The venue was opened in three phases, with the first phase opened in September 2007 by the then Leader of the Opposition David Cameron, the second phase was opened by Mayor Boris Johnson and the final third phase opened in May 2010 by Prime Minister David Cameron.

One of the final parts to open was the Altitude Viewing Gallery on the 29th floor.

Etzin sold the business to the current management firm, Alan Turtill, Sam Simpson and Mike Hockey in 2018 whilst retaining the IP and brand rights.

Alan Turtill took the helm of the new team as Managing Director supported in a management role and running Altitude was entrepreneur Mike Hockey and Sam Simpson.

The business closed temporarily during the COVID 19 Pandemic and did not reopen.

References

External links
 Altitude 360 London Homepage

Exhibition and conference centres in London
Millbank